Fetters is a surname. Notable people with the surname include:

 Kristina Fetters (1980–2014), American convict
 Mike Fetters (born 1964), American baseball player and coach
 Rob Fetters (born 1954), American composer

See also
 Fetter (surname)